James Sayer may refer to:
 James Sayers, or Sayer, English caricaturist
 James Sayer (British Army officer)
 Jimmy Sayer, English footballer

See also
 James Sayers (physicist), Northern Irish physicist